The Kimzha is a river in Leshukonsky and Mezensky Districts of Arkhangelsk Oblast in Russia. It is a left tributary of the Mezen. The main tributary is the Tyafsora (right).

The river basin of the Kimzha comprises a strip elongated from the south to the north and located between the basins of the Mezen and the Nemnyuga. The river flows in the general direction north. The Kimzha meanders, forming many lakes. The mouth of the Kimzha is several kilometers downstream from the selo of Kimzha and is approximately opposite to the mouth of the Pyoza, a right tributary of the Mezen.

The river valley is not populated except for the selo of Kimzha close to the river mouth. Several kilometers upstream, the Kimzha is crossed by a bridge, over which the road connecting Arkhangelsk and Mezen runs.

References

External links

Rivers of Arkhangelsk Oblast